Turbo jourdani , common name the Jourdan's turban, is a species of sea snail, marine gastropod mollusk in the family Turbinidae.

 Taxonomic status: Some authors place the name in the subgenus Turbo (Dinassovica)

Description
The length of the shell varies between 75 mm and 240 mm. The large, solid, imperforate shell has an ovate-conic shape with an acute spire. The color of its epidermis is castaneous or olive. The eight whorls are rounded and increase regularly in size. The upper ones are 1-3-carinate, the lower transversely obsoletely lirate. The body whorl is large, ventricose, descending, nearly smooth, or with wide spiral ribs. The circular aperture is white within. The outer lip is thin. The arcuate columella is not expanded at its base.

Distribution
This marine species is known from Geraldton, Western Australia, to central South Australia.

References

 Kiener, L.C. 1839. Nouvelle espèce de Mollusque du genre Turbo de Linné. Revue Zoologique par la Société Cuvierienne 1839: 324–325 
 Verco, J.C. 1908. Notes on South Australian marine Mollusca with descriptions of new species. Part IX. Transactions of the Royal Society of South Australia 32: 338–3
 Iredale,T. 1937. Middleton and Elizabeth Reef, South Pacific Ocean. The Australian Zoologist 8: 232–261 
 Cotton, B.C. 1959. South Australian Mollusca. Archaeogastropoda. Handbook of the Flora and Fauna of South Australia. Adelaide : South Australian Government Printer 449 pp.
 Wilson, B. 1993. Australian Marine Shells. Prosobranch Gastropods. Kallaroo, Western Australia : Odyssey Publishing Vol. 1 408 pp
 Alf A. & Kreipl K. (2003). A Conchological Iconography: The Family Turbinidae, Subfamily Turbininae, Genus Turbo. Conchbooks, Hackenheim Germany.
 Williams, S.T. (2007). Origins and diversification of Indo-West Pacific marine fauna: evolutionary history and biogeography of turban shells (Gastropoda, Turbinidae). Biological Journal of the Linnean Society, 2007, 92, 573–592.

External links
 

jourdani
Gastropods of Australia
Gastropods described in 1839